October 6 - Eastern Orthodox liturgical calendar - October 8

All fixed commemorations below celebrated on October 20 by Orthodox Churches on the Old Calendar.

For October 7th, Orthodox Churches on the Old Calendar commemorate the Saints listed on September 24.

Saints
 Hieromartyrs Julian the Presbyter, and Caesarius the Deacon, at Terracina (1st century or 268)
 Hieromartyr Eusebius the Priest and martyr Felix, at Terracina (1st century or 268)
 Saint Leontius the Governor, at Terracina (1st century or 268)
 Virgin-martyr Pelagia of Tarsus in Asia Minor (287)  (see also: October 8 - Greek)
 Martyrs Sergius and Bacchus, in Syria (290-303)
 Hieromartyr Polychronius, Priest, of Gamphanitus (4th century)
 Ten companions with Hieromartyr Polychronius (4th century):
 Saints Parmenias, Polyteleios, Elymos, Mocius, Chrysotelis, Maximus, Luke, Obadiah, Semnios and Olympiada.

Pre-Schism Western saints
 Saint Justina of Padua, a virgin-martyr in Padua in Italy under Diocletian  (c. 300)
 Martyrs Marcellus and Apuleius, in Capua in Italy.
 Saint Mark, Pope of Rome (336)
 Saint Canog (Cynog), martyred by barbarians in Merthyr Cynog (c.492)
 Saint Dubthach the First, Archbishop of Armagh in Ireland from 497 (513)
 Saint Palladius of Saintes, Bishop of Saintes in France (c.590)
 Saint Augustus, Abbot of Bourges in France and a friend of St Germanus of Paris (6th century)
 Saint Helanus, priest, in the diocese of Rheims in France (6th century)
 Martyr Osyth (Osith), Princess of Chich, England (c. 700)
 Saint Adalgis, Bishop of Novara in Italy (c.830-c.850)

Post-Schism Orthodox saints
 Venerable John the Hermit and 98 Venerable Fathers of Crete.
 Venerable Sergius the Obedient of the Kiev Caves Monastery (13th century)
 Venerable Sergius of Nurma in Vologda, Abbot (1412), disciple of St. Sergius of Radonezh.
 Venerable Joseph, Elder and Wonderworker, of Khevi, Georgia (1763)
 Saint Jonah of Manchuria, Bishop of Hankou, Manchuria, Wonderworker (1925)

New Martys and Confessors
 New Hieromartyr Valentine Sventsitsky, Archpriest, of Moscow (1931)
 New Hieromartyr Nicholas Kazansky, Priest (1942)

Other commemorations
 Uncovering (1514) of the relics of St. Martinian of Byelozersk, Abbot of Kirillo-Belozersky Monastery (White Lake) (1483)
 Icon of the Mother of God "Tenderness" of the Pskov Caves (1524)
 Synaxis of Panagia Nafpaktiotissa (Virgin of Nafpaktos) (1571)
 Uncovering of the relics (1906) of St. John Triantaphyllides, the New Chrysostom and Merciful, of Chaldia in Asia Minor (1903)

Icon gallery

Notes

References

Sources 
 October 7/20. Orthodox Calendar (PRAVOSLAVIE.RU).
 October 20 / October 7. HOLY TRINITY RUSSIAN ORTHODOX CHURCH (A parish of the Patriarchate of Moscow).
 October 7. OCA - The Lives of the Saints.
 The Autonomous Orthodox Metropolia of Western Europe and the Americas (ROCOR). St. Hilarion Calendar of Saints for the year of our Lord 2004. St. Hilarion Press (Austin, TX). pp. 74–75.
 The Seventh Day of the Month of October. Orthodoxy in China.
 October 7. Latin Saints of the Orthodox Patriarchate of Rome.
 The Roman Martyrology. Transl. by the Archbishop of Baltimore. Last Edition, According to the Copy Printed at Rome in 1914. Revised Edition, with the Imprimatur of His Eminence Cardinal Gibbons. Baltimore: John Murphy Company, 1916. pp. 309–310.
 Rev. Richard Stanton. A Menology of England and Wales, or, Brief Memorials of the Ancient British and English Saints Arranged According to the Calendar, Together with the Martyrs of the 16th and 17th Centuries. London: Burns & Oates, 1892. pp. 477–478.
Greek Sources
 Great Synaxaristes:  7 ΟΚΤΩΒΡΙΟΥ. ΜΕΓΑΣ ΣΥΝΑΞΑΡΙΣΤΗΣ.
  Συναξαριστής. 7 Οκτωβρίου. ECCLESIA.GR. (H ΕΚΚΛΗΣΙΑ ΤΗΣ ΕΛΛΑΔΟΣ).
  07/10/2017. Ορθόδοξος Συναξαριστής. 
Russian Sources
  20 октября (7 октября). Православная Энциклопедия под редакцией Патриарха Московского и всея Руси Кирилла (электронная версия). (Orthodox Encyclopedia - Pravenc.ru).
  7 октября по старому стилю / 20 октября по новому стилю. Русская Православная Церковь - Православный церковный календарь на 2016 год.

October in the Eastern Orthodox calendar